The Logistic Regiment "Pozzuolo del Friuli" is a military logistics regiment of the Italian Army based in Remanzacco in Friuli Venezia Giulia. Today the regiment is the logistic unit of the Cavalry Brigade "Pozzuolo del Friuli".

History

World War II 

The history of the regiment begins with the support units of the 104th Infantry Division "Mantova", which was formed on 15 March 1942 in Verona. The division remained in Piedmont until January 1943 when it was transferred to Nicastro in Calabria.

After allied forces had landed on the Italian peninsula and the Armistice of Cassibile between Italy and the Allies had been announced the division remained loyal to King Victor Emmanuel III. At the beginning of fall 1944 the division was ordered to re-organize as Combat Group "Mantova" destined for the frontlines in central Italy. The division completed its reorganization and arrived at the front just as the German forces in Italy were surrendering. On 15 October 1945 the Combat Group "Mantova" regained its old name Infantry Division "Mantova".

Cold War 
The Infantry Division "Mantova" was garrisoned in Varazze on the Ligurian coast until May 1947 when it was transferred to the city of Udine in north-eastern Italy. On 1 November 1956 the Service Units Command "Mantova" was activated in Udine, which took control of all logistical, maintenance, and medical units of the division. On 1 January 1972 the Service Units Command "Mantova" was reorganized and renamed Services Grouping "Mantova".

During the 1975 army reform the army disbanded the regimental level and newly independent battalions were granted for the first time their own flags. On 1 August 1976 the Services Grouping "Mantova" was reorganized as Logistic Battalion "Mantova". On 12 November 1976 the President of the Italian Republic Giovanni Leone issued decree 846, which granted the new units their flags. Initially the battalion consisted of a command, a command platoon, a transport and supply company, a medium workshop, and a vehicles park. On 10 December 1980 the battalion as reorganized as Logistic Maneuver Battalion "Mantova" and now consisted of a command, a command and services company, a supply company, a maintenance company, a medium transport company, and a mixed transport company.

On 1 October 1986 the Italian Army abolished the divisional level and the Mechanized Division "Mantova" was disbanded. On the same day the battalion was transferred to the Support Units Command of the 5th Army Corps. On 1 November 1986 the battalion was renamed 8th Logistic Maneuver Battalion "Carso". On 4 September 1994 the battalion was elevated to 8th Logistic Maneuver Regiment "Carso" without changing size or composition.

On 7 May 2001 the regiment joined the joined the Logistic Projection Brigade. On 27 July 2001 the regiment was reformed as 8th Transport Regiment and consisted of a regimental command, a command and logistic support company, a transport battalion, and a movement control battalion. On 12 September 2013 the Logistic Projection Command was disbanded and the 8th Transport Regiment was assigned to the 132nd Armored Brigade "Ariete". On 1 July 2015 the regiment was transferred to the Cavalry Brigade "Pozzuolo del Friuli" and was renamed Logistic Regiment "Pozzuolo del Friuli" and reorganized as a brigade supporting logistic regiment.

Current structure 
Like all Italian Army brigade logistic regiments the Logistic Regiment "Pozzuolo del Friuli" consists of:

  Regimental Command, in Remanzacco
 Logistic Battalion
 Command
 Tactical Control Squad
 Supply Company
 Transport Company
 Maintenance Company
 Command and Logistic Support Company
 C3 Platoon
 Transport and Materiel Platoon
 Deployment Support Platoon
 Commissariat Platoon
 Garrison Support Unit

The Regimental Command consists of the Commandant's and Personnel Office, the Operations, Training and Information Office, the Logistic Office, and the Administration Office.

See also 
 Military logistics

External links
Italian Army Website: Reggimento Logistico "Pozzuolo del Friuli"

References 

Logistic Regiments of Italy